World communism, also known as global communism, is the ultimate form of communism which of necessity has a universal or global scope. The long-term goal of world communism is an unlimited worldwide communist society that is classless (lacking any exploitation of man by man), moneyless (lacking a need for currency to regulate human behavior), and stateless (lacking any violent compulsion of man by man), which may be achieved through an intermediate-term goal of either a voluntary association of sovereign states (a global alliance) or a world government (a single worldwide state). 

A series of internationals have worked toward world communism and they have included the First International, the Second International, the Third International (the Communist International or Comintern), the Fourth International, the Revolutionary Internationalist Movement, Maoist Internationalist Movement, the World Socialist Movement, and variant offshoots. The methods and political theories of each International remain quite heterogeneous in their pursuit of the global communist society.

During the Stalinist era, the novel theory of socialism in one country, flew in the face of the generally accepted practice of Marxism at the time, and became part of the ideology of the Communist Party of the Soviet Union. Justifying the innovation, Joseph Stalin and his supporters concluded that it was naive to think that world revolution was imminent in the 1920s–1930s after Germany's Bavarian Soviet Republic failed to produce the anticipated socialist vanguard state to lead the world in revolution; instead descending into fascism and the murder of Rosa Luxemburg. This caused great disillusionment among many socialists worldwide, who agreed with Karl Marx and Vladimir Lenin's analysis that an international scope was vital to communist success but could not at the time explain the fascist deviation in world affairs. Currents of national communism, especially after World War II, broke the prewar hegemonic popularity of internationalist communism in view of standing nations in the Stalinist mold. 

The end of the Cold War, with the Revolutions of 1989 and the dissolution of the Soviet Union, is often called the fall of communism in the Stalinist mold. Nevertheless, the international communist tendencies remain among Maoists, Trotskyist, left communists, and some present-day Russian communists among others seeking to further refine and revise the theory of dialectical materialism.

Early era (1917–1944) 
Marxist philosophy observed that because capitalism had begun to exhaust the low hanging fruit of domestic exploitation, it had to become Imperialist and seek the global exploitation of both markets by extraction/colonialism and workers by the exploitation of labour. This need for profit as the sole motivating force of the capitalist class acts like an invisible hand to compel class solidarity among the now international capitalist class of the world against any attempt to unify in solidarity by the (now also international) workers of the world. The capitalist class' goal to maintain profitability and thus their class' dominance is the engine and reason for the class conflict). 

Recognition by man of the pain of this exploitation by capitalists inexorably unites the proletariat of the world and necessitates international cooperation to halt the suffering of mankind. This proletarian internationalism has as its aim the end of continuous subjugation via divide and rule by the comparatively few capitalists who seek to stop the development of class consciousness in their workers lest they too form trade unions to counter the capitalists monopolies; (thus the rallying cry of all true socialists "Workers of the world, unite!"). In this view, after a transitional period of international socialism the terminal stage of development of the (future) history of communism would likewise be replaced by world communism. 

Theoreticians differ on whether world communism may be achieved peacefully despite the clear class conflict. Those who believe the capitalist class would not put down their property rights to become workers again believe the transition to world communism must be more contentious. World communism as the utopian final goal of the class conflict can only be achieved by world revolution as "injustice anywhere is a threat to justice everywhere" in the words of noted socialist, Martin Luther King Jr. 

As such, World communism is ultimately incompatible with the permanent existence of the nation state formation as a means of organizing people and property. To be a socialist is to believe that people are people everywhere, even within nations and they must unite to end their own exploitation by the would be elitists of capitalism. Whether the people unite in a supranational unions of sovereign states or a world government to progress through the socialist phase of human development is guided by the desire to end this capitalist exploitation of mankind. 

This transitional period of Socialism shall then continue to develop the productive forces and alleviate drudgery until such time as either the state becomes irrelevant to organizing human activity and the people agree to the abolition of the state or the now useless state undergoes what Marx and Engels call the withering away of the state. When governance no longer requires state institutions or state power no one would desire it nor wield it. In other words, the people of a utopian communist society would be self-governing via direct democracy so direct that the state would not even exist.

Abolition of the state is not in itself a distinctively Marxist doctrine. It was sometime it was happened by any of the country held by various socialist and anarchist thinkers of the nineteenth century as well as some present-day anarchists (libertarians are anti-statist typically in a subtly different sense, in that they support small government although not absence of government or state). The crux here is a text of the Friedrich Engels, from his Anti-Dühring. It is often cited as "The state is not 'abolished,' it withers away". 

This is from the pioneer work of historical materialism, a formulation of Marx's idea of a materialist conception of history. The withering away of the state is a graphic formulation, that has passed into cliché. The translation (Engels was writing in German) is also given as: "The state is not 'abolished'. It dies out". 

Reference to the whole passage shows that this happens only after the proletariat has seized the means of production. The schematic is therefore revolution, transitional period, ultimate period. Although the ultimate period sounds like a utopia, Marx and Engels did not consider themselves utopian socialists, but rather scientific socialists. They considered violence necessary for resistance of wage slavery.

Whereas for Engels the transitional period was reduced to a single act, for Lenin thirty to forty years later it had become extended and "obviously lengthy". In the same place, he argues strongly that Marx's conception of communist society is not utopian, but takes into account the heritage of what came before.

This gives at least roughly the position on world communism as the Comintern was set up in 1919: world revolution is necessary for the setting up of world communism, but not as an immediate or clearly sufficient event.

Stalinist and Cold War era (1947–1991) 
During the Stalinist era, the idea of socialism in one country, which many internationalists considered unworkable, became part of the ideology of the Communist Party of the Soviet Union as Stalin and his supporters concluded that the transitional period would indeed be very long and complicated. Advocates of socialism in one country had not abandoned the goal of ultimate world communism, but they considered it naive to think world revolution was imminent. Thus the Soviet Union dissolved the Third International during World War II. However, Stalin did not intend to implement isolationism despite this one-country approach. 

Despite retaining the earlier Bolshevik terminology equating imperialism with capitalism and thus decrying empire, the Soviet Union instead pursued a de facto empire of satellite states, similar in ways to the czarist Russian Empire although Soviet ideology could not admit that, to counter the influence of capitalist countries. It also supported revolutionary socialism around the world to continue to work toward world communism, however distant it might be. Thus it backed the 26th of July Movement in the Cuban Revolution, the North Vietnamese in the Vietnam War and the MPLA in the Angolan Civil War. The domino theory of the Cold War was driven by this intent as anti-communists feared that isolationism by capitalist countries would lead to the collapse of their self-defense.

Collapse and survival 
Socialism survived in China, North Korea, Vietnam, Laos and Cuba, after severe internal crises. In 1989-1991 the party control collapsed in other Communist states, which then entered into Post-communism. Yugoslavia plunged into a long complex series of wars between ethnic groups. Soviet-oriented Communist movements collapsed in countries where it was not in control.

International communism has not reappeared. Nevertheless, some international communists remain among some factions of Maoists, left communists, some present-day Russian communists and others.

See also 
 Communist nostalgia
 Dissolution of the Soviet Union
 Fall of communism in Albania
 
 List of communist parties with national parliamentary representation
 Post-communism
 Predictions of the collapse of the Soviet Union
 Revolutions of 1989

References

Further reading 
 Bown, Archie. The Rise and Fall of Communism (2009).
 Kotkin, Stephen. Armageddon Averted: The Soviet Collapse, 1970-2000 (2nd ed. 2008) excerpt
 
 
 Fürst, Juliane, Silvio Pons and Mark Selden, eds. The Cambridge History of Communism (Volume 3): Endgames? Late Communism in Global Perspective, 1968 to the Present (2017) excerpt
 Pons, Silvio, and Robert Service, eds. A Dictionary of 20th-Century Communism (2010).
 
 

Communism
Communist theory
Marxist theory
World government